Tootsie Roll Industries is an American manufacturer of confectionery based in Chicago, Illinois. Its best-known products include the namesake Tootsie Rolls and Tootsie Pops. Tootsie Roll Industries currently markets its brands internationally in Canada, Mexico, and over 75 other countries.

History
In 1896, Leo Hirschfeld, an Austrian Jewish immigrant to the United States, began work at a small candy shop located in New York City owned by the Stern & Saalberg firm. In 1907, Hirschfeld decided he wanted a chocolate-tasting candy that would not melt in the heat, and that would be an economical artificial alternative to traditional chocolates. He named the candy after the nickname of his daughter, Clara "Tootsie" Hirschfeld. By this point, the company had expanded to a five-story factory. In 1917, the name of the company was changed to The Sweets Company of America. It was reformed and listed on the American Stock Exchange in 1919.

The business forced Hirschfeld out about a year later, and he started a new company, Mells Candy Corporation, also known as The Merry Mells Company. Owing to health and family issues, he committed suicide in 1922. Mells failed in 1924.

In 1931, the Tootsie Pop — a hard-candy lollipop with Tootsie Roll filling — was invented, and quickly became popular with Dust Bowl refugees during the Depression era because of its low price. During World War II, Tootsie Rolls became a standard part of American soldiers' field rations, due to the sustainability of the candy under a variety of environmental conditions.

In 1935, the company was in serious difficulty. Its principal supplier of paper boxes, Joseph Rubin & Sons of Brooklyn — concerned about the possible loss of an important customer — became interested in the possibility of acquiring control. The company was listed on the New York Stock Exchange, but Bernard D. Rubin acquired a list of shareholders and approached them in person in order to purchase their shares. The Rubins eventually achieved control and agreed that Bernard would run the company as president. Mr. Rubin was able to steadily increase sales and restore profits, changing the formula of the Tootsie Roll and increasing its size, moving from Manhattan to a much larger plant in Hoboken, New Jersey, and guiding the company successfully through the difficult war years when vital raw materials were in short supply. When he died in 1948, he had increased the sales volume twelvefold. After his death, his brother William B. Rubin became president and remained president until 1962.

In 1962, William's daughter, Ellen Rubin Gordon, took control, and as of January 2015, is Chairman and CEO of the company. For many years prior to his death, her husband, Melvin Gordon, was Chairman and CEO from 1962 to 2015.

In 1966, the company adopted its current name of "Tootsie Roll Industries, Inc."

The company has acquired several famous brands of confections such as The Candy Corporation of America's Mason Division (1972), Cella's Confections (1985), The Charms Company (1988), Warner-Lambert's candy division (1993; excluding gum and mints), Andes Candies (2000), and Concord Confections (2004).

Facilities
The company's headquarters is located on the South Side of Chicago, in a portion of the former Dodge Chicago Plant where the majority of the company's candy is produced. The company also has a factory in Mexico City where it produces some flavors of Tootsie Pops and other candy products for the Mexican market as well as for export to the U.S. and Canada.  There is also a candy factory in The Port neighborhood of Cambridge, Massachusetts (belonging to the subsidiary "Cambridge Brands", formerly home to its predecessor, the James O. Welch Company), and a factory in Spain that produces candy for export to Canada.

Brands and products

Tootsie Roll brands and products include:
 Andes Chocolate Mints
 Candy Blox
 Cella's chocolate-covered cherries
 Charleston Chew candy bars
 Charms Blow Pops and Caramel Apple Pops
 Child's Play assorted candies
 Dots gumdrops and Crows licorice candy
 Dubble Bubble, Thrills, Razzles, and Cry Baby chewing gum
 Fluffy Stuff cotton candy
 Frooties fruit flavored chewy candy
 Junior Mints
 Nik-L-Nip juice confection
 Polar Mint
 Sugar Daddy and Sugar Babies
 Tootsie Rolls and Tootsie Pops
 Wack-O-Wax, wax lips candy

References

External links
 Tootsie Roll Industries web site

Confectionery companies of the United States
 
Food and drink companies based in Chicago
Manufacturing companies based in Chicago
American companies established in 1896
Food and drink companies established in 1896
1896 establishments in Illinois
Companies listed on the New York Stock Exchange
American brands